Port of Naissaar (port code EE NAI) is a seaport situated on the eastern coast of Naissaar island, Viimsi Parish, Estonia, located in northern area of Tallinn Bay.

See also

Transport in Estonia

References

External links

 Saarte Liinid, Naissaare Port - Rules, Rules of Naissaare Port

Naissaare
Transport in Tallinn